Lindsay Dianne Benko (born November 29, 1976), also known by her married name as Lindsay Mintenko, is an American former competition swimmer, Olympic gold medalist, and former world record-holder. She represented the United States at the 2000 Summer Olympics and 2004 Summer Olympics. She held the short-course world record in the 400-meter freestyle (at 3:59.53) for nearly three years from January 2003 to December 2005.

Early years
Benko attended the Stanley Clark School in South Bend, Indiana, for her elementary education. Upon graduating from Stanley Clark, she attended Elkhart Central High School in Elkhart, Indiana, where she was "the first swimmer in IHSAA history to sweep two individual events all four years while piling up All-American honors."

Swimming career 
At the 2000 Olympics, Benko was a member of the USA's gold-medal-winning 4×200-meter freestyle relay. Four years later at the 2004 Olympics, she earned gold swimming in the heats of the 4×200 m freestyle relay and silver swimming the heats of the 4×100-meter freestyle relay.

Acting career 
In 2000, Benko played herself in an episode of The Jersey called "Sophomore Year" where Morgan Hudson (played by Courtnee Draper) fights to have girls soccer reinstated after it was canceled, Nick Lighter (played by Michael Galeota) uses a magical jersey by jumping into her body as he wins the race and uses a news crew to promote his cousin's attempt to save girls soccer at the school with a fundraising car wash.

Personal life and management career 
In 2005, Benko married Canadian swimmer Mike Mintenko. She uses her married name professionally. She previously worked for USA Swimming as the national team managing director. In 2017, she became the first woman to lead USA Swimming’s National Team Division.

See also
 List of Olympic medalists in swimming (women)
 List of University of Southern California people
 List of World Aquatics Championships medalists in swimming (women)
 World record progression 200 metres freestyle
 World record progression 400 metres freestyle

References

External links
 
 
 
 

1976 births
Living people
American female backstroke swimmers
American female freestyle swimmers
World record setters in swimming
Medalists at the FINA World Swimming Championships (25 m)
Olympic gold medalists for the United States in swimming
Olympic silver medalists for the United States in swimming
People from Elkhart, Indiana
Swimmers at the 2000 Summer Olympics
Swimmers at the 2004 Summer Olympics
USC Trojans women's swimmers
World Aquatics Championships medalists in swimming
Medalists at the 2004 Summer Olympics
Medalists at the 2000 Summer Olympics